Churchtown may refer to:

England
 Churchtown, Cornwall
 Churchtown, Cumbria, a United Kingdom location
 Churchtown, Derbyshire, a United Kingdom location
 Churchtown, Devon, a United Kingdom location
 Churchtown, Lancashire
 Churchtown, Lincolnshire, Belton, North Lincolnshire
 Churchtown, Merseyside (historically in Lancashire)
 Churchtown, Shropshire
 Churchtown, Somerset

Isle of Man
 Churchtown, Isle of Man, a United Kingdom location

Northern Ireland
 Churchtown, County Tyrone, a townland in County Tyrone, Northern Ireland

Republic of Ireland
 Churchtown, County Cork
 Churchtown, County Kildare, a civil parish of Ireland
 Churchtown, County Westmeath (civil parish), a civil parish in the barony of Rathconrath]
 Churchtown, County Wexford; see List of shipwrecks in February 1823
 Churchtown, Dublin
 Churchtown, Kilmacnevan, a townland in the civil parish of Kilmacnevan, barony of Moygoish, County Westmeath
 Churchtown, Rathconrath, a townland in the civil parish of Churchtown, barony of Rathconrath, County Westmeath

United States
 Churchtown, Iowa
 Churchtown, New Jersey
 Churchtown, Ohio
 Churchtown, Pennsylvania

See also
 Kirkton (disambiguation), Scottish name for a small church settlement